Tuatara is the name of two different characters appearing in comic books published by DC Comics.

Fictional character biography

Jeremy Wakefield
Tuatara's first appearance took place in Super Friends #8 (November 1977), which is set outside the mainstream DC Comics continuity. Jeremy Wakefield is a young New Zealander who can see through time with the help of a third eye. He explained that with two eyes, we can see three dimensions and with three eyes through four dimensions. The fourth dimension is time. He thus named himself after the tuatara, a reptile with a parietal eye or "third eye". In his first mission he helped the Red Tornado dismantle a bomb in the Prehistoric Era. After aiding the Super Friends fight against a time menace, Tuatura becomes a member of the Global Guardians.

Tuatara's first mainstream appearance was in Justice League International #12 (April 1988). A few years later, the Global Guardians are all brainwashed into service under the Queen Bee of Bialya. Tuatara, Rising Sun and Wild Huntsman are sent off on specific missions to attack Nazi strongholds and Justice League members. Tuatara is sent to attack a Neo-Nazi fringe group based in Dover, England. The Justice League members Metamorpho, Elongated Man and Flash were traveling to the site on a ferry when they encounter Tuatara. He had sneaked aboard the ferry itself. The battle, which takes place mostly underwater, is ended when he is wrapped up in the Elongated Man's body. He is taken to the surface, calls the League members 'Nazis' and soon falls into a coma.

He is taken care of at an Australian medical facility, paid for by the Justice League. A little bit before he was to move to the Justice League International embassy medical ward, the Queen Bee sends a signal to awaken him. He vanishes, which angers his Australian friend, the Tasmanian Devil. He returns to Bialya, along with Rising Sun and Wild Huntsman, who had awakened at the same time as he. All three are duly brainwashed. Tuatara and his friends escape this brainwashing after several battles with the Justice League and with other Guardians.

All is not well. The new ruler of Bialya, President Harjavti, is just as dangerous and deadly as the Queen Bee. Rising Sun has left for Japan and Owlwoman has vanished. Unknown to them, Tuatara and his remaining friends are in constant danger, as Harjavti struggles to keep control of the team. Owlwoman eventually hunts down Doctor Mist and the original Jack O'Lantern.

With his assistance, the Guardians escape from under the thumb of Bialya.

Tuatara's last appearance was in Justice League Quarterly #17 (winter 1994). The Guardians are now based out of a South Pacific island and Tuatara is not doing well at all. He comes to believe he is going insane as a result of losing control of his precognition powers.

His friends, scattered across the world, are attacked by Fain Y'onia. Godiva and Impala lose their powers. Olympian is badly injured. Bushmaster is outright killed as a result of his confrontation.

Those able to fight gather in the Arizona desert. When Fain attempts to attack Owlwoman, they ambush him. This attempt does not go well. Thunderlord is killed and Tuatara takes a blow to the face. The Wild Huntsman takes Fain out of this reality.

Due to his injuries, Tuatara falls into a coma. His medical care is supervised by the former Guardians member Seraph.

Tuatara II
A second Tuatara appears as an associate of the Silicon Syndicate. He is a villain with reptilian powers.

Powers and abilities
Tuatara is a mutant born with three eyes. This enables him to see into the past and future, allowing him to prevent events before they occur, and also assists him in hand-to-hand combat.

References

External links
 Tuatara I at DC Comics Wiki
 Tuatara II at DC Comics Wiki

DC Comics metahumans
DC Comics superheroes
Comics characters introduced in 1977
Fictional New Zealand people